Atakeccuram Nagabilam Temple, Tiruvarur, is a Siva temple in Tiruvarur in Tiruvarur District in Tamil Nadu (India).

Vaippu Sthalam
It is one of the shrines of the Vaippu Sthalams sung by Tamil Saivite Nayanar Appar. This temple is found as a separate shrine inside the Thyagaraja Temple, Tiruvarur.

Presiding deity
The shrine is found in the south Prakaram of the temple. It is known as The presiding deity is known as Adakesvarar.

References

External links
 Muvar Thevara Vaippu Thalangal, மூவர் தேவார வைப்புத்தலங்கள், ATakEccuram, Sl.No.17 of 139 temples
 Shiva Temples, தேவார வைப்புத்தலங்கள், ஆடகேச்சரம், Sl.No.12 of 133 temples, page1

Hindu temples in Tiruvarur district
Shiva temples in Tiruvarur district